Tourism brings both positive and negative impacts on tourist destinations. The traditionally-described domains of tourism impacts are economic, socio-cultural, and environmental dimensions. The economic effects of tourism include improved tax revenue and personal income, increased standards of living, and more employment opportunities. Sociocultural impacts are associated with interactions between people with differing cultural backgrounds, attitudes and behaviors, and relationships to material goods. Environmental impacts can have both direct effects including degradation of habitat, vegetation, air quality, bodies of water, the water table, wildlife, and changes in natural phenomena, and indirect effects, such as increased harvesting of natural resources to supply food, indirect air and water pollution (including from flights, transport and the manufacture of food and souvenirs for tourists).

Tourism also brings positive and negative health outcomes for local people. The short-term negative impacts of tourism on residents' health are related to the density of tourist's arrivals, risk of disease transmission, road accidents, higher crime levels, as well as traffic congestion, crowding, and other stressful factors. In addition, residents can experience anxiety and depression related to their risk perceptions about mortality rates, food insecurity, contact with infected tourists, etc., which can result in negative mental health outcomes. At the same time, there are positive long-term impacts of tourism on residents’ health and well-being outcomes through improving healthcare access positive emotions, novelty, and social interactions.

Economic impacts 
About 1.4 billion people visited another country in 2019, with tourist spending contributing about US$1.45 trillion to the global economy. Europe is by far the dominant origin and arrival region for tourists, accounting for 51% of arrivals and 48% of travelers in 2019.

Tourism can be divided into subcategories into which impacts fall: spending from visitors on tourism experiences, like beach holidays and theme parks (domestic and international), business spending, and capital investment.

The economic contribution of tourism is felt in both direct and indirect ways, where direct economic impacts are created when commodities like the following are sold: accommodation and entertainment, food and beverages services, and retail opportunities.  Residents, visitors, businesses, and various levels of governments (municipal to federal) all influence direct tourism impacts through their spending in or near a given tourism area. The key component of direct economic impacts of tourism is that they occur within a country's borders and are implemented by "residents and non-residents for business and leisure purposes".

In contrast, indirect economic impacts of tourism can be found in investment spending surrounding a tourism offering from private and governmental interests. This investment may not explicitly be related to tourism, but benefits the tourist and local stakeholders all the same. Indirect impacts of tourism are exemplified by the purchase and sale of intermediary items, like additional supplies for restaurants during the high tourism season, or widened sidewalks in busy downtown centres. Indirect economic impacts (the supply chain, investment, and government collective) account for 50.7 percent of the total GDP contribution from travel and tourism in 2014.

Induced spending, which is the re-circulation of a tourist dollar within a community, is another way that tourism indirectly has an impact on a community. For example, a foreign tourist injects money into the local economy when he spends a dollar on a souvenir made by a local at the tourism destination. That individual goes on to spend that dollar on lunch from a local vendor, and that vendor goes on to spend it locally.

Positive and negative economic impacts of tourism 

There are both positive and negative effects on communities related to the economic impacts of tourism in their communities.  A positive impact can refer to the increase in jobs, a higher quality of life for locals, and an increase in wealth of an area. Tourism also has the advantage of rebuilding and restoring historic sites and encouraging the revitalization of cultures. A positive impact is to increase or to make better either for the tourist, the host community and residence and/or the tourist destination. Positive impacts are related more to the materialistic well-being, rather than to the happiness of a host community or tourist.

The tourist destination enjoys positive impacts, if there have been improvements to the natural environment such as protection, national parks, or man-made infrastructure, waste-treatment plants. Tourism provides the economic stimulus to allow for diversification of employment and income potential, and develop resources within the community. Improvements in infrastructure and services can benefit both the locals and the tourists. Whereas, heritage tourism focuses on local history or historical events that occurred in the area, and tends to promote education. Positive impacts begin when there is an increase in job opportunities for locals as the tourism industry becomes more developed. There is also an increase in average income that spreads throughout the community when tourism is capitalized on. In addition, the local economy is stimulated and diversified, goods are manufactured more locally, and new markets open for local business owners to expand to. Unfortunately, these benefits are not universal nor invulnerable. While more employment may be available, tourism-related jobs are often seasonal and low-paying. Prices are known to fluctuate throughout the year. They rise in the high tourist season to take advantage of more tourist dollars, but have the side effect of pricing goods above the economic reach of local residents, effectively starving them out of a place that was once their home.

Negative impacts are the effects, that are caused in most cases, at the tourist destination site with detrimental impacts to the social and cultural area, as well as the natural environment. As the population increases so do the impacts, resources become unsustainable and exhausted, the carrying capacity for tourists in a destination site may become depleted. Often, when negative impacts occur, it is too late to impose restrictions and regulations. Tourist destinations seem to discover that many of the negative impacts are found in the development stage of the tourism area life cycle (TALC).

Additionally, the economics of tourism have been shown to push out local tourism business owners in favour of strangers to the region. Foreign ownership creates leakage (revenues leaving the host community for another nation or multinational business) which strips away the opportunity for locals to make meaningful profits. Foreign companies are also known to hire non-resident seasonal workers because they can pay those individuals lower wages, which further contributes to economic leakage. Tourism can raise property values near the tourism area, effectively pushing out locals and encouraging businesses to migrate inwards to encourage and take advantage of more tourist spending.

Employment 
Employment, and both its availability and exclusivity, are subsets of economic impacts of tourism. Travel and tourism create 10.7 percent of the total available jobs worldwide, in both the direct and indirect tourism sectors. Direct tourism jobs, those that provide the visitor with their tourism experience include, but are not limited to: accommodation (building, cleaning, managing), food and drink services, entertainment, manufacturing, and shopping Indirect tourism employment opportunities include the manufacturing of aircraft, boats, and other transportation, as well as the construction of additional superstructure and infrastructure necessary to accommodate these travel products (airports, harbours, etc.)

Tourism satellite account
The World Travel and Tourism Council (WTTC) tourism satellite account (TSA) is a system of measurement recognized by the United Nations to define the extent of an economic sector that is not so easily defined as industries like forestry or oil and gas Tourism does not fit neatly into a statistical model; because it is not so much dependent on the physical movement of products and services, as it is on the position of the consumer. Therefore, TSAs were designed to standardize these many offerings for an international scale to facilitate better understanding of current tourism circumstances locally and abroad. The standardization includes concepts, classifications, and definitions, and is meant to enable researchers, industry professionals, and the average tourism business owner to view international comparisons.

Before TSAs were widely implemented, a gap existed in the available knowledge about tourism as an economic driver for GDP, employment, investment, and industry consumption; indicators were primarily approximations and therefore lacking in scientific and analytical viewpoints. This gap meant missed opportunities for development, as tourism stakeholders were unable to understand where they might be able to better establish themselves in the tourism economy. For example, a TSA can measure tax revenues related to tourism, which is a key contributor to the level of enthusiasm any level of government might have towards potential tourism investment. In addition, Tyrrell and Johnston suggest that stakeholders in tourism benefit from the TSA because it:

 provides credible data on the impact of tourism and the associated employment
 is a framework for organizing statistical data on tourism
 is an international standard endorsed by the UN Statistical Commission
 is an instrument for designing economic policies related to tourism development
 provides data on tourism's impact on a nation's balance of payments
 provides information on tourism human resource characteristics

Through collection of more qualitative data and translating it into a more concise and effective form for tourism providers, TSAs are able to fill the previous knowledge gap. Information delivered and measured by a TSA includes tax revenues, economic impact on national balances, human resources, employment, and "tourism's contribution to gross domestic product".

Sociocultural impacts 
An inherent aspect of tourism is the seeking of authenticity, the desire to experience a different cultural setting in its natural environment. Although cultural tourism provides opportunities for understanding and education, there are serious impacts that arise as a result. It is not only the volume of tourism at work, but the types of social interactions that occur between tourist and host. There are three broad effects at the local level: the commodification of culture, the demonstration effect, and the acculturation of another culture.

Commodification of culture
Commodification of culture refers to the use of a cultural traditions and artifacts in order to sell and profit for the local economy. With the rise of tourism, authors argue that commodification is inevitable. There are both positive and negative sociocultural impacts of commodification on a culture. One positive is the creation of business and jobs for local craftsmen, who are able to sell their goods to tourists. Rural tourism is seen as a "cure" for poverty and leads to the improvement of transportation and development of telecommunications in an area. For the tourist, commodification creates an interest for traditional arts and social practices.

On the other hand, some researchers argue that contact with the secular West leads to the destruction of pre-tourist cultures. In addition, the "development cure", the idea that increasing tourism will spur economic change while strengthening local culture, is claimed to lead to various social problems, such as drug abuse, crime, pollution, prostitution, social instability, and growth of capitalist values and a consumer culture.

Demonstration effect
The demonstration effect was introduced to tourism when the researchers were looking into the effects of social influences from tourism on local communities. The demonstration effect argues that local inhabitants copy the behavioral patterns of tourists. There are a number of social, economic and behavioral reasons as to why the demonstration effect comes into play. One economic and social reason is that locals copy the consumption patterns of those higher up the social scale in order to improve their social status. Tourism has also been accused of affecting social behavior of the younger members of a host community, who may imitate what tourists do, impacting traditional value systems.

Criticisms of the demonstration effect 
There are many criticisms of the demonstration effect in tourism. First, tourism is seen as only one aspect of change in society. Local people also see examples of foreign lifestyles and consumption in advertisements, magazines, television, and films, and therefore tourism is not the only influence on local culture. In addition, the demonstration effect implies that a culture is "weak" and needs to be protected by outside influences. In many cases, the demonstrative effect is seen as a negative consequence, but it is argued that "all cultures are in a continual process of change", therefore tourism should not be considered destructive.

Community participation 
Community participation refers to the collaboration between community members for the purposes of achieving common goals, improving their local community and pursuing individual benefits. Local community members are actively involved in tourism, rather than passively benefiting from it. Community participation strengthens communities and help to create a sense of belonging, trust and credibility among members. By involving local community members, tourism can become more authentic. The community and the tourists both benefit from community participation, as it boosts their respect for the traditional lifestyle and values of the destination community. Most destination community members are also the ones most impacted by tourism, therefore there is an importance in their involvement in tourism planning. Some researchers will argue that some of the negative impacts of tourism might be avoided and the positive impacts maximized through community participation in the planning process.

Acculturation
Acculturation is the process of modifying an existing culture through borrowing from the more dominant of cultures. Typically in tourism, the community being acculturated is the destination community, which then experiences dramatic shifts in social structure and world view. Societies adapt to acculturation in one of two ways. Innovation diffusion is when the community adopts practices that are developed by another group; whereas cultural adaptation is less adoption of a new culture and more the process of changing when the existing culture is changed. Acculturation is often seen as a method of modernizing a community and there are many opposing views to the concept of modernization. One argument against modernization is that it contributes to the "homogenization of cultural differences and the decline of traditional societies". This means that communities will advertise their modernity to attract tourists, and will disregard their traditional customs and values. On the other hand, others argue that acculturation and modernization will help traditional communities adjust in a modern world. The idea being that teaching people to adapt will save the community from future extinction.

Positive socio-cultural impacts
There are number of benefits for the host community as a result of tourism. This includes economic benefits such as opportunities for local businesses which allows for increased trade among the increased number of visitors and then develops a variety of local businesses. In addition, tourism also brings employment opportunities, enhances the economy of the region, and creates revenue for the local government. Tourists also use public services, creating funding for public services, such as health, the police and the fire department, as well as increasing the demand for public transport. Other public facilities, such as parks and benches are also well kept by the community for the tourists, improving the overall aesthetics of the host community. On a more social level, tourism leads to intercultural interaction. Tourists often engage and learn from the locals. Tourism can also increase pride in locals. They want to show off their community that tourists have chosen to visit. The increase in people also leads to creating more social venues and experiences where locals and tourists can interact in. Entertainment and recreational facilities will allow for more opportunity to socialize and engage with each other. Tourism can be beneficial for the host community as it provides the financial means and the incentive to preserve cultural histories, local heritage sites, and customs. It stimulates interest in local crafts, traditional activities, songs, dance, and oral histories. It also opens up the community to the wider world, new ideas, new experiences, and new ways of thinking.

Negative socio-cultural impacts 
Cultural interactions can have negative effects. In terms of economic disadvantages, local communities need to be able to fund the tourist demands, which leads to an increase of taxes. The overall price of living increases in tourist destinations in terms of rent and rates, as well as property values going up. This can be problematic for locals looking to buy property or others on a fixed income. In addition, to balance out tourist destinations, the number of locals to tourists must be relatively equal. This can be more problematic for tourists as their access could be denied.

Other negative sociocultural impacts are differences in social and moral values among the local host community and the visiting tourist. Outside of affecting the relationship between tourist and local, it can also cause friction between groups of the local population. In addition, it can cause drifts in the dynamics between the old and new generations. Tourism has also correlated to the rise of delinquent behaviors in local host communities. Crime rates have been seen to rise with the increase of tourists. Crimes are typically those of rowdy behavior, alcohol and illegal drug use, and loud noise. In addition, gambling and prostitution may increase due to tourists looking for a "good time". Tourism has also caused more disruption in host communities. Crowding of locals and tourists may create a vibrant ambiance, it also causes frustration and leads to the withdrawal of local residents in many places. Increased tourists also results in increased traffic which can hinder daily life of the local residents. Culture shock may impact both tourists and their hosts.

Illegal activities 

Tourism is sometimes associated with export or theft of contraband such as endangered species or certain cultural artifacts, and illegal sex trade activities.

Tourism fatigue and anti-tourism sentiment 
Excessive hordes of visitors (or of the wrong sort of visitors) can provoke backlashes from otherwise friendly hosts in popular destinations.

In recent years, the local population in many areas has developed anti-tourism sentiment and begun to protest against tourists. One of the most prominent examples of such a mobilization was the so-called "Tourists go home" movement, which emerged in 2014 in Spain due to slogans and mottos calling the tourists to go back to their homes. Venice also faced such problems, and the "Tourists go home" slogans appeared on the walls of the city. Moreover, several other countries, such as Japan and the Philippines, are having problems with overtourism.

The year 2017 seems to be a landmark for anti-tourism sentiment as "a new Spanish social movement against an economic development model based on mass tourism gained following high-profile attacks targeting foreign tourists and local business interests." Anti-tourism sentiment also seems to be linked to a clash of identity and people's individualism.

Tourism and protection of cultural property 

Tourism and the protection of cultural property are two subject areas that often complement each other, but sometimes also face one another. In the case of cultural tourism, gentle tourism and adventure tourism, there are numerous points of contact between the marketing, mediation and preservation of cultural assets. Sensible use is usually the most effective protection of valuable goods. If cultural assets bring the population an economic advantage, they are also interested in their preservation.

The increase in tourism can be a blessing and a curse at the same time, because social media and other new advertising channels often attract so many tourists to one place that it can lead to "overkill". World Heritage Sites are therefore increasingly resorting to visitor restrictions in order to be able to contain the flood of tourists. Conversely, tourism also has the effect that certain cultural assets become known and, in the event of war, parties to the conflict want to prevent their destruction with regard to international opinion.

With regard to the protection of cultural assets in the event of armed conflict, there are numerous initiatives on this topic from the UN, UNESCO and Blue Shield International. This also applies to World Heritage Sites. But only through cooperation with the locals can the protection of tourist cultural sites, world heritage sites, archaeological finds, exhibits and archaeological sites from destruction, looting and robbery be implemented in a sustainable manner. Simply agreeing international contracts and contacting state authorities is not enough. In the event of war, it is particularly important to monitor and implement protection directly on site, because this is the only way to ensure the future use of tourist goods for the population. The founding president of Blue Shield International, Karl von Habsburg, aptly summed it up with the words: "Without the local community and without the local participants, this would be completely impossible."

Environmental impacts

Ecotourism, nature tourism, wildlife tourism, and adventure tourism take place in environments such as rain forests, high alpine, wilderness, lakes and rivers, coastlines and marine environments, as well as rural villages and coastline resorts. Peoples' desire for more authentic and challenging experiences results in their destinations becoming more remote, to the few remaining pristine and natural environments left on the planet. The positive impact of this can be an increased awareness of environmental stewardship. The negative impact can be a destruction of the very experience that people are seeking. There are direct and indirect impacts, immediate and long-term impacts, and there are impacts that are both proximal and distal to the tourist destination. These impacts can be separated into three categories: facility impacts, tourist activities, and the transit effect.

Environmental sustainability focuses on the overall viability and health of ecological systems. Natural resource degradation, pollution, and loss of biodiversity are detrimental because they increase vulnerability, undermine system health, and reduce resilience. More research is needed to assess the impacts of tourism on natural capital and ecosystem services. Interdisciplinary and transdisciplinary research is needed to address how the tourism industry impacts waste and wastewater treatment, pollination, food security, raw materials, genetic resources, oil and natural gas regulation and ecosystem functions such as soil retention and nutrient recycling.

Negative environmental consequences related to tourism activities, such as greenhouse gas emissions from air travel, and litter at popular locations, can be significant. The tourism sector accounts for about 5% of global CO2 emissions with aviation contributing to 40% of CO2 emissions related to tourist transportation.

Facility impacts 
Facility impacts occur when a regional area evolves from "exploration" to "involvement" and then into the "development" stage of the tourist area life cycle. During latter phase, there can be both direct and indirect environmental impacts through the construction of superstructure such as hotels, restaurants, and shops, and infrastructures such as roads and power supply. As the destination develops, more tourists seek out the experience. Their impacts increase accordingly. The requirement for water for washing, waste disposal, and drinking increases. Rivers can be altered, excessively extracted, and polluted by the demands of tourists. Noise pollution has the capacity to disturb wildlife and alter behavior, and light pollution can disrupt the feeding and reproductive behavior of many creatures. When power is supplied by diesel or gasoline generators there is additional noise and pollution. General waste and garbage are also a result of the facilities. As more tourists arrive there is an increase in food and beverages consumed, which in turn creates waste plastic and non-biodegradable products.

Coastal tourism
Many coastal areas are experiencing particular pressure from growing numbers of tourists and rising sea levels due to climate change. Coastal environments are limited in extent consisting of only a narrow strip along the edge of the ocean. Coastal areas are often the first environments to experience the detrimental impacts of tourism. Planning and management controls can reduce the impact on coastal environments and ensure that investment into tourism products supports sustainable coastal tourism.

Tourist activities 

Practically all tourist activities have an ecological impact on the host destination. In rural destinations activities such as hiking can impact the local ecology.

There are a range of impacts from hiking, trekking, and camping that directly affect the activity area. The most obvious is the erosion and compaction of trails through daily use. With the presence of obstacles such as fallen trees or puddles, trails becomes widened or informal trails are created to bypass the obstacle. Other direct impacts include damage or removal of vegetation, loss of vegetation height, reduction in foliage cover, exposure of tree root systems, migration of trampled vegetation, and introduction of non-native species. Indirect impacts on trails include changes in soil porosity, changes to microflora composition, problems with seed dispersion and germination, and degradation of soil nutrient composition.

As many hikers and trekkers take multi-day trips, a large number will camp overnight either in formal or random campsites. There are similar impacts on campsites, such as soil compaction, erosion and composition, loss of vegetation and foliage, and the additional issues regarding campfires. Informal trails are created around the campsite in order to collect firewood and water, and trees and saplings can be trampled, damaged, or cut-down for fuel. The heat of campfires may damage tree-root systems.

Certain invasive species, such as the zebra mussel, are spread through tourist activities, which can have a negative impact on local ecosystems. There are ways to decrease the spread of non-native species, such as taking care in removing seeds from shoes and pants after hiking or biking, thoroughly cleaning boats when moving between bodies of water, and creating designated pathway management plans.

Wildlife viewing, such as safaris in the savannas of East Africa, can lead to changes in animal behavior. The presence of humans tends to increase the stress hormones of wild animals. Additionally, baboons and hyenas have learnt to track tourist safari vehicles to lead them to cheetah kills, which they then steal.

There is a small but significant number of tourists who pay considerable sums of money in order to trophy hunt lions, rhino, leopards, and even giraffes. It has been argued that there is a positive and negative, direct and indirect, environmental impact caused by trophy hunting. There is a continued discussion at national and international government level as to the ethics of funding conservation efforts through hunting activities.

Another tourism destination activity is scuba diving. There are many negative direct environmental impacts caused by recreational diving. The most apparent is the damage caused by poorly skilled divers standing on the reef itself or by accidentally hitting the fragile coral with their fins. Studies have shown that naïve divers who engage in underwater photography are considerably more likely to accidentally damage the reef. As the cost of underwater photography equipment has declined and its availability increased, it is inevitable that there will be an increase of direct damage to reefs by divers. Other direct impacts include over-fishing for "marine curios", sedimentation, and in-fill. There is also direct environmental impact due to disturbed and altered species behaviour from fish feeding, as well as import of invasive species and pollution caused by dive-boats. There are also indirect impacts such as shoreline construction of superstructure and infrastructure.

Mount Everest

Mount Everest attracts many tourist climbers wanting to summit the peak of the highest mountain in the world each year. Everest is a UNESCO World Heritage site. Over the years, carelessness and excessive consumption of resources by mountaineers, as well as overgrazing by livestock, have damaged the habitats of snow leopards, lesser pandas, Tibetan bears, and scores of bird species. To counteract past abuses, various reforestation programs have been carried out by local communities and the Nepalese government.

Expeditions have removed supplies and equipment left by climbers on Everest's slopes, including hundreds of oxygen containers. A large quantity of the litter of past climbers—tons of items such as tents, cans, crampons, and human waste—has been hauled down from the mountain and recycled or discarded. However, the bodies of most of the more than 260 climbers who have died on Everest (notably on its upper slopes) have not been removed, as they are unreachable or—for those that are accessible—their weight makes carrying them down extremely difficult. Notable in the cleanup endeavour have been the efforts of the Eco Everest Expeditions, the first of which was organized in 2008 to commemorate the death that January of Everest-climbing pioneer Sir Edmund Hillary. Those expeditions also have publicized ecological issues (in particular, concerns about the effects of climate change in the region through observations that the Khumbu Icefall has been melting).

Effects from transportation 

Since 2009, there has been a steady yearly increase in the number of tourist arrivals worldwide of approximately 4.4 percent. In 2015, there were 1.186 billion tourist arrivals worldwide, of which 54 percent arrived by air (640 million), 39 percent (462 million) by motor vehicle, 5 percent by water (59 million), and 2 percent by rail (23.7 million). A seven-hour flight on a Boeing 747 produces 220 tonnes of CO2, which is the equivalent of driving an average size family saloon car for a year, or the energy requirement of an average family home for nearly 17 years. With the ever-increasing number of tourist arrivals, there is an ever-increasing quantity of global greenhouse gasses (GHG) being produced by the tourism industry. In 2015 it is estimated that 5 percent of global GHG emissions was attributable to air travel alone.

Cruise ships 

Cruises are among the fastest-growing sectors of the global travel industry. Over the past decade, cruise industry revenue grew to 37 billion U.S. dollars, and the demand for cruise travel has increased. Some argue that the profitability of mass tourism overshadows environmental and social concerns. For example, the ocean environment suffers from the dumping of wastewater and sewage, anchors damage the seabed and coral reefs and smokestack emissions pollute the air. Social issues that have been linked to the cruise industry include poor wages and living conditions as well as discrimination and sexual harassment.

Small Island tourism 

Small Islands often depend on tourism, as this industry makes up anywhere from 40% to 75% of the GDP (Gross Domestic Product) for various islands including Barbados, Aruba, Isle of Man, and Anguilla.

Mass tourism, including the cruise industry, tends to put a strain on fragile island ecosystems and the natural resources it provides. Studies have shown that early practices of tourism were unsustainable and took a toll on environmental factors, hurting the natural landscapes that originally drew in the tourists. For example, in Barbados, beaches are the main attraction and have been eroded and destroyed over the years. This is due to inefficient political decisions and policies along with irresponsible tourist activity, such as reckless driving and waste disposal, damaging coastal and marine environments. Such practices also altered physical features of the landscape and caused a loss in biodiversity, leading to the disruption of ecosystems. Many other islands faced environmental damage such as Isle of Man and Samoa.

However, visitors are attracted to the less industrial scene of these islands, and according to a survey, over 80% of the people enjoyed the natural landscape when they visited, many commenting that they wanted to protect and save the wildlife in the area. Many tourists have turned to practices of sustainable and eco-tourism in an attempt to save the nature they enjoy in these locations, while some political entities try to enforce this in an attempt to keep tourism in their island afloat.

Health impacts 
Tourism brings both positive and negative effects on the health of local people. The short-term negative effects are related to the density of tourists’ arrivals, traffic congestion, crowding, crime level, and other stressful factors. Inbound tourism also increases the spread of SARS, MERS, COVID-19, and other diseases that transmit from human-to-human, which recently led to closed borders, travel restrictions, canceled flights, etc. Sexually transmitted infections are also often transferred between visitors and residents. Road accidents is another negative outcome of tourism development since visitors are not aware of local rules, driving norms, and road conditions. Furthermore, alcohol-related crash rates are significantly higher for tourists.

The positive long-term health outcomes of tourism arrivals can be explained by the influence of positive experiences and social interactions with visitors on physical health and longevity. The literature suggests that diverse social relationships lead to lower risks for morbidity and premature mortality. Since diverse interactions of local people with tourists provide positive experiences that could affect physical health, tourism development might positively influence the health of the local people in the long run through positive emotions and social interactions.

See also 
Biopsychosocial model
Broaden-and-build
Impacts of poverty on health
Overtourism
Sustainable tourism

References

External links 
 

Economy and the environment
Tourism